Gary Paul O'Neil (born 18 May 1983) is an English former professional football midfielder and the current Head Coach of Premier League club AFC Bournemouth. O'Neil has previously played for  Portsmouth (where he was the Player of the Season in 2006), Walsall, Cardiff City, Middlesbrough, West Ham United, Queens Park Rangers, Norwich City, Bristol City and Bolton Wanderers.

Club career

Portsmouth
O'Neil was born in Beckenham, London. Tony Pulis gave O'Neil his Portsmouth debut as a 16-year-old on 29 January 2000 at home to Barnsley in the First Division, but kept him out of the spotlight for the rest of the season. The following year both Pulis and his successor Steve Claridge used O'Neil sparingly but Portsmouth's third manager of a disastrous season, Graham Rix, made O'Neil a starter for the final five matches of the season. Portsmouth went into the final game against Barnsley needing to win to have any chance of avoiding relegation to what was then the Second Division. They won the match 3–0 and survived, with O'Neil scoring the second goal, his first in professional football.

In the 2001–02 season, still a teenager, O'Neil became a key player in a young team. Despite another disappointing campaign for the club, O'Neil's own reputation continued to increase and he scored a volley against Millwall.

When Harry Redknapp took over as manager at the end of the 2001–02 season, O'Neil was one of the few players not to be moved on in the rebuilding of the squad. In Redknapp's first full season O'Neil only started 11 league matches, scoring three goals.

The 2002–03 campaign may have been disappointing personally for O'Neil but it was a great one for the club as they convincingly won the First Division title, thereby gaining promotion to the Premier League. He was loaned to Walsall at the beginning of the 2003–04 season in order to gain first team experience. His impressive performances for the Midlands side and Portsmouth's increasing injury problems led to a recall in November 2003. He went straight into the starting eleven for his Premier League debut against bottom of the table Leeds United at Fratton Park and scored two goals in a 6–1 win. This performance meant that he maintained his place for the next match, away at Fulham but then had to travel to Dubai to captain England Under 20s in the 2003 FIFA World Youth Championship. Upon his return, O'Neil found that Portsmouth's injury problems had cleared up and he could not break back into the team for the remainder of the season.

At the beginning of the 2004–05 season he was loaned to Cardiff City to gain further first team experience, scoring once in the league against Millwall. He was recalled to Portsmouth in November who yet again were experiencing an injury crisis. He made his return to the side in one of the biggest matches of the season, a 2–1 defeat at Southampton. He was picked again for the next match, at home to Manchester City, and scored in a 3–1 loss. This match proved to be a turning point in both the history of Portsmouth and the career of O'Neil as it proved to be the last match of Redknapp's reign. Technical director Velimir Zajec took over a temporary manager and made O'Neil a regular in the Pompey midfield. During Zajec's five-month reign Portsmouth fell from midtable to relegation candidates and Alain Perrin was appointed to keep the club in the Premier League. O'Neil remained a crucial part of the Frenchman's plans and was one of the main reasons why Portsmouth were not relegated back to the First Division after only two seasons. His outstanding performances at right midfield and centre midfield and his goal away at Manchester United were enough to convince European champions Liverpool to bid £5million for him, a bid which was rejected by Portsmouth.

O'Neil went into the 2005–06 season as a regular for Perrin's new-look team and, like in the 2002–03 campaign, he was one of the few players to survive from the previous year. By November Portsmouth were at the bottom of the Premier League and Perrin was sacked only seven months after being appointed. The return of Redknapp was seen by some to signal the end of O'Neil's Portsmouth career. Many people believed that Redknapp did not rate O'Neil and this view seemed to be confirmed in 2004 during the feud between Redknapp and the chairman Mandaric when the latter claimed he has vetoed an attempt to sell O'Neil to Cardiff. In Redknapp's first match back in charge at Tottenham Hotspur, O'Neil retained his place in the team and was picked on the right of midfield. O'Neil's late handball conceded the penalty for Spurs' winner. O'Neil was moved into his preferred position of central midfield a few games later and Pompey went on their best run of the season with O'Neil scoring in successive home games. For the home game with Everton in January 2006 O'Neil captained Pompey for the first time but disappointingly for him this was also the game where he was moved back to the right to allow new signings Pedro Mendes and Sean Davis to form a partnership in the middle. Pompey lost the game 1–0 and went on a run of form that left them near certainties for relegation in mid-March but O'Neil's performance in a crucial 1–1 draw against Bolton Wanderers saw him keep his place in the starting XI. Two weeks after this draw, Pedro Mendes' last minute winner against Manchester City sparked a comeback. Pompey gained 14 points out of the next seven games and secured survival at Wigan Athletic's JJB Stadium on 29 April with a 2–1 victory.

O'Neil was a regular at the right of midfield for Portsmouth in the 2006–07 and despite only contributing one goal Portsmouth finished 9th, their best in the Premier League at that time.

Middlesbrough

O'Neil signed for Middlesbrough on 31 August 2007 for an undisclosed fee, believed to be in the region of £5 million. O'Neil, whilst not scoring for Middlesbrough during his first season, was considered a success. His lively displays down the right-hand side of midfield, and occasionally in the centre, have earned him plaudits from the Boro fans and manager, Gareth Southgate. "I think he's done a fantastic job on the right hand side this year, I think there's more to come from him". In all he made 26 appearances in the league, and three in the FA Cup during the club's run to the quarter-final.

Reports surfacing in May 2008 suggested that O'Neil might look to move on from Middlesbrough after he and his family had failed to settle on Teesside.
O'Neil scored his first Middlesbrough goal in the 2008–09 season on 29 October in Middlesbrough's 2–0 win over Manchester City.

O'Neil started the 2009–10 season as Southgate's first choice central midfielder, with Julio Arca being dropped to the bench for the first matches of the season. It was soon revealed that O'Neil would require a hernia operation, yet he spoke out and said he would, "Delay the operation so as to ease Boro's midfield crisis." The first game after his operation, on 12 September, led to his first goal. He was taken down in the box yet managed to pull himself up to loop Marvin Emnes' return ball over the Ipswich Town keeper. The game ended 3–1 in Middlesbrough's favour. Just three days later, on 15 September, he was taken down with a head injury bleeding against Sheffield Wednesday and required stitches, so was taken off the pitch for treatment and returned minutes later. The game ended 3–1, with O'Neil playing an important part in Boro's midfield dominance. O'Neil managed 119 appearances and scored seven goals in total for Boro.

West Ham United
On 25 January 2011, O'Neil completed a move to West Ham United on a -year contract for an undisclosed fee. He made his debut in the League Cup semi-final, second leg, against Birmingham City, coming on as an 83rd-minute substitute for Luis Boa Morte. On 6 February 2011, O'Neil made his Premier League debut for the Hammers against Birmingham City in a 1–0 defeat at Upton Park and also completed the full 90 minutes. His 2010–11 season was ended prematurely on 16 April 2011 following a tackle by Aston Villa's Nigel Reo-Coker during West Ham's 2–1 home defeat at Upton Park. O'Neil was carried off on a stretcher after the challenge. He underwent a two-hour ankle operation and endured several months out of action with concern that his footballing career was in jeopardy. O'Neil was reported as considering taking legal action against Reo-Coker. By the end of the 2010–11 season, he had made nine appearances for the Hammers in all competitions.

O'Neil scored his first goal for West Ham in a 4–1 away win against Blackpool on 21 February 2012 and proved to be a key player in the team's end of season form which saw them reach the Premier League after beating Blackpool 2–1 at Wembley in the Championship play-off final. On 7 June 2013, the Premier League confirmed that he had been released by West Ham. Although released, O'Neil said that discussions were taking place related to him being offered a new contract and that he was likely to sign a new deal nearer the start of the new season. However, David Gold announced on his Twitter account that O'Neil had declined a new contract offer, and consequently became a free agent.

Queens Park Rangers
On 7 August 2013, O'Neil signed for Championship side Queens Park Rangers on a one-year deal, re-uniting with former manager Harry Redknapp. He scored his first goal for the club on 11 January 2014 in a 3–1 win over Ipswich Town. O'Neil was a member of the Queens Park Rangers side which won the 2014 Football League Championship play-off Final, 1–0 against Derby County on 24 May 2014. He was sent off in the 60th minute in the game at Wembley for a professional foul on Johnny Russell.

Norwich City
On 5 August 2014, O'Neil signed for Championship side Norwich City, on a two-year deal. At the end of his contract he left the club.

Bristol City
On 9 June 2016, O'Neil signed for Championship side Bristol City on a two-year contract starting on 1 July 2016. He scored his first goal for Bristol City in a 2–1 loss at Reading on 26 November 2016.

He was released by Bristol City at the end of the 2017–18 season.

Bolton Wanderers
On 3 August 2018, he completed a move to Bolton Wanderers on an initial short-term contract until January 2019, following a successful trial spell at the University of Bolton Stadium. He made his Bolton debut a day after signing, when coming on as a second-half substitute for fellow debutant Luke Murphy in a 2–1 win over West Bromwich Albion at The Hawthorns.

He played over thirty games for Bolton in 2018–19, scoring in the games against Rotherham United, Millwall and Wigan Athletic, but could not prevent the club from being relegated to League One. However, his efforts were recognised by the club's supporters as he won the Player of the Year award.

International career
O'Neil earned caps for England at every youth level, and captained England at the 2003 FIFA under-20 World Youth Championship. He made nine appearances for the England under-21 team.

Managerial career

Early career
In August 2020, O'Neil was appointed as assistant manager to Barry Lewtas for Liverpool's under-23 squad.

Following the appointment of Jonathan Woodgate as manager of Championship club AFC Bournemouth until the end of the 2020–21 season, O’Neil joined Bournemouth as senior first team coach on 23 February 2021. He remained at the club following Woodgate's departure at the end of the season, and was a part of the coaching staff that got the club promoted to the Premier League under new manager Scott Parker in 2021–22.

AFC Bournemouth
On 30 August 2022, O'Neil was placed in caretaker charge by Bournemouth following Parker's dismissal. He took charge of the team for the first time the following day, in a 0–0 draw against Wolves, before picking up his first victory in the club's following match, a 3–2 victory against Nottingham Forest on 3 September. They would remain unbeaten for 4 more games after that, including a 2–1 victory against Leicester on 8 October, while O'Neil garnered a nomination for Premier League Manager of the Month for the team's performances in September. He would remain in caretaker charge until the season paused for the 2022 FIFA World Cup, adding another Premier League victory, against Everton on 12 November, during that stretch.

On 27 November, having picked up 13 points from a possible 33, O'Neil was appointed as Bournemouth's permanent head coach, signing an initial 18-month contract.

Personal life
O'Neil married to Donna Guerin in 2006.

Career statistics

Managerial statistics

Honours
Portsmouth
Football League First Division: 2002–03

West Ham United
Football League Championship play-offs: 2012

Queens Park Rangers
Football League Championship play-offs: 2014

Norwich City
Football League Championship play-offs: 2015

References

External links

Gary O'Neil Official Website at officialplayerwebsites.com
Profile at the AFC Bournemouth website
BBC profile 

England profile at The FA

1983 births
Living people
Footballers from Beckenham
English footballers
Association football midfielders
Portsmouth F.C. players
Walsall F.C. players
Cardiff City F.C. players
Middlesbrough F.C. players
West Ham United F.C. players
Queens Park Rangers F.C. players
Norwich City F.C. players
Bristol City F.C. players
Bolton Wanderers F.C. players
English Football League players
Premier League players
England youth international footballers
England under-21 international footballers
English football managers
AFC Bournemouth managers
Premier League managers
Association football coaches
Liverpool F.C. non-playing staff
AFC Bournemouth non-playing staff